The 1953 New Zealand gallantry awards were announced via a special honours list dated 20 January 1953, and recognised New Zealand military personnel for gallant and distinguished services in Korea between 1 January and 30 June 1952.

Order of the Bath

Companion (CB)
Military division, additional
 Brigadier Ronald Stuart Park  – commander, New Zealand Emergency Force.

Order of the British Empire

Member (MBE)
Military division, additional
 Second Lieutenant Richard Marchant Burrows – Royal New Zealand Corps of Signals.
 Major George Solomon – Royal New Zealand Artillery.
 Captain Jack Mahony Wilson – Royal New Zealand Electrical and Mechanical Engineers.

Military Medal (MM)
 Bombardier Louis John Maioni Gordon – Royal New Zealand Artillery.

Mention in despatches
 Bombardier John Howard Beange – Royal New Zealand Artillery.
 Sergeant Reginald Thomas Benyon – Royal New Zealand Army Medical Corps.
 Warrant Officer (Class I) John Dickinson – Royal New Zealand Artillery.
 Warrant Officer (Class I) Evan Charles Gummer – New Zealand Regiment.
 Lance Corporal Ian Lockhard Hawkes – Royal New Zealand Army Service Corps.
 Captain Cecil John Moloughney – Royal New Zealand Artillery.
 Temporary Corporal Robert Alexander Struthers – Royal New Zealand Corps of Signals.
 Temporary Captain Thomas Alfred Noel Vine – Royal New Zealand Artillery.
 Sergeant Robert Wallace – Royal New Zealand Corps of Signals.

References

Gallantry awards
New Zealand gallantry awards